The Book Thief is a 2013 war drama film directed by Brian Percival and starring Geoffrey Rush, Emily Watson, and Sophie Nélisse. The film is based on the 2005 novel of the same name by Markus Zusak and adapted by Michael Petroni. The film is about a young girl living with her adoptive German family during the Nazi era. Taught to read by her kind-hearted foster father, the girl begins "borrowing" books and sharing them with the Jewish refugee being sheltered by her foster parents in their home. The film features a musical score by Oscar-winning composer John Williams.

The Book Thief premiered at the Mill Valley Film Festival on October 3, 2013, and was released for general distribution in the United States on November 8, 2013. The film received mixed reviews upon its theatrical release with some reviewers praising its "fresher perspective on the war" and its focus on the "consistent thread of humanity" in the story, with other critics faulting the film's "wishful narrative". With a budget of $19 million, the film was successful at the box office, earning over $76 million.

The Book Thief received  Oscar, Golden Globe and BAFTA nominations for its score. For her performance in the film, Sophie Nélisse won the Hollywood Film Festival Spotlight Award, the Satellite Newcomer Award, and the Phoenix Film Critics Society Award for Best Performance by a Youth in a Lead or Supporting Role – Female. The film was released on Blu-ray and DVD on March 11, 2014.

Plot

In February 1938, Death tells  how a young girl called Liesel Meminger had piqued his interest. In one of the opening scenes, twelve-year-old Liesel is travelling with her mother and younger brother on a train. On the way, her brother dies and is buried next to the tracks. Liesel steals her first book, titled The Grave Digger's Handbook, when it falls out of the gravedigger's pocket. Liesel is then brought to her new home in Munich, where she meets her new foster parents Rosa Hubermann and Hans Hubermann. Rudy Steiner, a boy who lives next door, accompanies her on her first day of school. When the teacher asks Liesel to write her name on the chalkboard, she is only able to write three Xs, revealing to her classmates that she is unable to write. She is taunted by her schoolmates who chant "dummkopf" ("dunce") at her. One of the boys, Franz Deutscher, challenges her to read just one word to which Liesel responds by beating him up. She impresses Rudy, and they become fast friends. When Hans, her foster father, realizes that Liesel cannot read, he begins to teach her, using the book that she took from the graveside along with a giant chalkboard. Liesel becomes captivated with reading anything she can.

Liesel and Rudy become members of the Hitler Youth movement. While at a Nazi book burning ceremony, Liesel and Rudy are harassed by Franz into throwing books onto the bonfire, but Liesel is upset to see the books being burned. When the bonfire ends and everyone leaves, Liesel is still there and she grabs a book that has been only singed. She is seen by Ilsa Hermann, wife of the Burgermeister (mayor). When Rosa asks Liesel to take the laundry to the mayor's spacious, gated house, she realizes that the woman who saw her taking the book is the mayor's wife. Instead, Ilsa takes her into their library and tells Liesel she can come by anytime and read as much as she'd like. One day Liesel is found reading by the mayor, who not only puts a stop to her visits but dismisses Rosa as their laundress.

During Kristallnacht, Max Vandenburg and his mother, who are Jewish, are told by a friend that only one of them can escape, and Max's mother forces him to go. Max's father had saved Hans' life in World War I, and hence he goes to the Hubermanns' house, where Rosa and Hans give him shelter. Max initially stays in Liesel's room while recovering from his trip, and they begin to become friends over their mutual hatred of Hitler. World War II begins, initially making most of the children in Liesel's neighborhood very happy. Max is moved to the basement so that he can move around more, but it is cold and he becomes dangerously ill. Liesel helps him recover by reading to him at every spare moment books "borrowed" from the mayor's library.

One day while "borrowing" a book from the mayor's home, Liesel is followed by Rudy. He discovers the secret of Max, whose name he reads on a journal Max gave to Liesel for Christmas. Rudy guesses that her family is hiding someone, and he swears to never tell anyone. Franz overhears Rudy's last words and violently pushes Rudy to reveal the secret. Rudy throws the journal into the river to keep it from Franz. After Franz leaves, Rudy plunges into the icy river to rescue the journal, and Liesel realizes that she can truly trust him. Soon, a local party member comes by to check the Hubermanns' basement, and they have to hide Max.

While working, Hans sees a neighbour and friend named Lehman being taken away by the police because he is a Jew. Hans tries to intervene, telling the officer that Lehman is a good man, but Hans's name is taken by the soldiers and he is thrown to the ground. Hans realizes what a mistake he has made, since this has made his family visible. He tells the family, and Max realises he must leave in order to protect them. Hans then receives a telegram that he has been conscripted into the army and must leave immediately.

On the way home from school, Liesel believes she has seen Max in a line of Jews being forcibly marched through town, and she begins screaming his name, running through the line. She is thrown to the sidewalk twice by German soldiers and finally gives up when Rosa picks her up and takes her home.

Hans returns home after being injured, and the family is reunited only for a short time. One night the city is bombed by accident, and the air raid sirens fail to go off. Hans, Rosa, Rudy's family and Franz are killed in the blast. Liesel is spared from the bombing because she fell asleep in the basement while writing in the journal given to her by Max. She sees her foster family on the ground, dead; she cries and hugs them. Soldiers bring Rudy out of his house alive, but he dies a few moments later after almost telling Liesel he loves her. Liesel begs him to wake up, and kisses him on the lips as a goodbye. Liesel passes out, and one of the soldiers carries her to a stretcher. When she wakes up, she sees a book among the rubble and picks it up. She then sees the mayor and Ilsa drive up. With Ilsa being the only friend she has left, Liesel runs up to her and hugs her.

Two years later, after Germany has been occupied by the Allies, Liesel is working in the tailor shop owned by late Rudy's father when Max suddenly enters. Overjoyed by his survival and return, she runs to hug him. The final scene is Death speaking again about Liesel's life and her death at the age of 90, mentioning her husband, children, and grandchildren, as we look over her modern day Manhattan Upper East Side apartment with pictures of her past and a portrait of her younger self, upon which the camera lingers. The narrator does not state whom she had married but implies that she became a renowned writer.

Cast

Production
A search for an actress to play the eponymous book thief, Liesel Meminger, occurred across the world. On February 4, 2013, it was announced that Canadian actress Sophie Nélisse was cast in the role and that Australian actor Geoffrey Rush and English actress Emily Watson would be playing Meminger's foster parents.

Principal photography began in early March 2013 at Babelsberg Studio in Potsdam-Babelsberg, Germany. Locations included Marquardt Palace. The first trailer was released on August 21, with the Bastille song "Haunt" as the music.

Markus Zusak, Australian author of the best-selling, award-winning book on which the film is based, confirmed on his blog that the film would be narrated by the character of "Death", as was the novel. After some speculation that Death might be voiced by the anonymous American actor who was used in the official trailer, it was announced that English actor Roger Allam of Game of Thrones would portray Death in the film.

Soundtrack
The music for the film was composed by John Williams, and the soundtrack album containing the score was released by Sony Classical and Fox Music. The album was released in the United States on November 19, 2013. It was nominated for an Academy Award, BAFTA and Golden Globe for Best Original Score. It won Best Instrumental Album at the 57th Grammy Awards.

The Book Thief marked the first time since 2005 that Williams had scored a film not directed by Steven Spielberg.

Release

Originally scheduled for January 17, 2014, The Book Thiefs limited theatrical release was moved forward to November 8, 2013, due to the fact that it was finished ahead of schedule and in order to compete in the 2013–14 award season. It premiered at the Mill Valley Film Festival on October 3, 2013, and was screened at the Savannah Film Festival on October 29, 2013. It expanded to a wide release on November 27, 2013.

Reception

Critical response
The Book Thief received mixed reviews from critics. Review aggregation website Rotten Tomatoes gives the film a score of 47%, based on 149 reviews, with an average score of 5.70/10. The site's consensus states, "A bit too safe in its handling of its Nazi Germany setting, The Book Thief counters its constraints with a respectful tone and strong performances." On Metacritic, the film has a score of 53 out of 100, based on 31 critics, indicating "mixed or average reviews".

In her review for the New Empress Magazine, Mairéad Roche praised the film for providing a "fresher perspective on the war" through the experiences of ordinary Germans who lived through the Nazi era. In addition to the "Oscar-baiting beautiful" cinematography and John Williams's film score that contribute to the film's emotional appeal, Roche singled out the performance of young Sophie Nélisse as Liesel that "matches the well-measured and seemingly effortless efforts of both Rush and Watson". Roche concluded,

In his review following the Mill Valley Film Festival, Dennis Harvey at Variety magazine wrote, "Rush generously provides the movie's primary warmth and humor; Watson is pitch-perfect as a seemingly humorless scold with a well-buried soft side." Harvey also praised the film's cinematography and film score, noting that "impeccable design contributions are highlighted by Florian Ballhaus'[s] somber but handsome widescreen lensing and an excellent score by John Williams that reps his first feature work for a director other than Steven Spielberg in years."

Stephanie Merry of The Washington Post was less impressed with the film, giving it two and half out of four stars. Merry felt that the film "has its moments of brilliance, thanks in large part to an adept cast" but that the film ultimately shows the difficulties of bringing a successful novel to the screen. In his review for the Los Angeles Times, Robert Abele was also unimpressed, describing the film as "just another tasteful, staid Hollywoodization of terribleness, in which a catastrophic time acts as a convenient backdrop for a wishful narrative rather than the springboard for an honest one".

Accolades

Home media
The Book Thief was released on Blu-ray and DVD on March 11, 2014.

References

External links

 
 
 
 

2013 films
2013 drama films
2013 war drama films
2010s American films
2010s English-language films
2010s German films
20th Century Fox films
American war drama films
American World War II films
Babelsberg Studio films
English-language German films
Films about books
Films about censorship
Films about children
Films about death
Films about families
Films about Nazi Germany
Films about orphans
Films about personifications of death
Films based on Australian novels
Films directed by Brian Percival
Films produced by Karen Rosenfelt
Films scored by John Williams
Films set in Germany
Films set in Manhattan
Films set in the 1930s
Films set in the 1940s
Films set in the 2010s
Films shot in Brandenburg
Films with screenplays by Michael Petroni
German war drama films
Holocaust films
TSG Entertainment films
Works about reading